Allan Everett was an Australian rules footballer.

Allan Everett may also refer to:

Allan Everett (admiral) (1868–1938), British Royal Navy officer

See also
Allen Everitt, English architectural artist and illustrator